The Heart of a Cracksman is a 1913 silent film short directed by Wallace Reid and Willis Roberts and starring Reid and Cleo Madison. It was produced by Powers Pictures and distributed by Universal Film Manufacturing Company.

Cast
 Wallace Reid - Gentleman Crook
 Cleo Madison - Marcia, Carlton's Niece
 James Neill - Carlton
 Ed Brady - Carlton's son
 Marcia Moore - Carlton's Daughter-in-Law

References

External links

1913 films
1913 drama films
American silent feature films
Silent American drama films
American black-and-white films
1910s American films